Murray Wesley Wall (September 19, 1926 – October 8, 1971) was born to George Wesley Wall and Mary Mae Havens and was an American middle relief pitcher in Major League Baseball who played between the  and  seasons for the Boston Braves (1950), Boston Red Sox (1957–59) and Washington Senators (1959). A native of Dallas, he was signed by the Braves in 1950 as a free agent out of the University of Texas at Austin.

In a four-season career, Murray posted a 13–14 record with a 4.20 ERA and 13 saves in 91 appearances (one start), including 82 strikeouts, 63 walks, and 193.0 innings pitched.  In his last MLB season, Wall was traded by Boston to the Washington Senators on June 11 in a four-player deal that included Senator pitcher Dick Hyde. He appeared in one game for Washington before being returned to the Red Sox on June 14 when Hyde's sore arm voided the Wall-for-Hyde portion of the transaction.

Murray committed suicide by gunshot on his farm near Lone Oak, Texas at the age of 45.

References

External links 

 Retrosheet

1926 births
1971 suicides
All-American college baseball players
Atlanta Crackers players
Baseball players from Dallas
Boston Braves players
Boston Red Sox players
Cangrejeros de Santurce (baseball) players
Dallas Eagles players
Dallas Rangers players
Liga de Béisbol Profesional Roberto Clemente pitchers
Major League Baseball pitchers
Milwaukee Brewers (minor league) players
Minneapolis Millers (baseball) players
Seattle Rainiers players
Suicides by firearm in Texas
Texas Longhorns baseball players
Toledo Sox players
Washington Senators (1901–1960) players
Farmers from Texas